Unai Vergara Díez-Caballero (born 20 January 1977), known simply as Unai, is a Spanish retired professional footballer who played as a central defender.

He amassed La Liga totals of 74 matches and five goals over four seasons, almost exclusively with Villarreal. The owner of a powerful left-foot shot, he also played in the competition with Albacete.

Club career
Unai in Portugalete, Biscay. After three seasons playing with modest sides in the Catalonia area, he represented CP Mérida in 1999–2000's second division, where he produced a fine individual campaign; however, although the Extremadura team finished sixth, the club was relegated for lack of payment to its players.

Subsequently, Unai joined Villarreal CF, which had just returned to La Liga. He was relatively used during three seasons, also adding three goals in his first. His first match in the competition took place on 28 October 2000, when he came from the bench in a 0–0 home draw against Athletic Bilbao.

After a string of injuries (some serious), Unai had an unassuming loan spell at Albacete Balompié, being released in June 2004 and going on to represent Elche CF, UE Lleida (second level) and CF Gavà (third).

International career
On 28 February 2001, Unai made his sole appearance for Spain, playing 90 minutes in a 0–3 friendly loss against England in Birmingham. Previously, he represented the nation at the 2000 Summer Olympics, playing three times for the eventual silver medalists.

Unai was the first-ever Villarreal player to be called up for either team.

Honours
Spain U23
Summer Olympic silver medal: 2000

References

External links

1977 births
Living people
People from Portugalete
Sportspeople from Biscay
Spanish footballers
Footballers from the Basque Country (autonomous community)
Association football defenders
La Liga players
Segunda División players
Segunda División B players
CD Masnou players
UE Sant Andreu footballers
UDA Gramenet footballers
CP Mérida footballers
Villarreal CF players
Albacete Balompié players
Elche CF players
UE Lleida players
CF Gavà players
Spain under-21 international footballers
Spain under-23 international footballers
Spain international footballers
Olympic footballers of Spain
Olympic silver medalists for Spain
Footballers at the 2000 Summer Olympics
Olympic medalists in football
Medalists at the 2000 Summer Olympics
Basque Country international footballers